Alicia Barrancos (born May 2, 1972) is a retired female freestyle swimmer from Argentina who represented her native country at the 1996 Summer Olympics in Atlanta, Georgia. She claimed the bronze medal in the Women's 800m Freestyle event at the 1995 Pan American Games.

References
 

1972 births
Living people
Argentine female swimmers
Argentine female freestyle swimmers
Olympic swimmers of Argentina
Swimmers at the 1991 Pan American Games
Swimmers at the 1995 Pan American Games
Swimmers at the 1996 Summer Olympics
Pan American Games bronze medalists for Argentina
Pan American Games medalists in swimming
Medalists at the 1995 Pan American Games
20th-century Argentine women